Mike's Murder is the 1983 motion picture soundtrack album from the film of the same name starring Debra Winger and written and directed by James Bridges. The album features original music by Joe Jackson. It is his sixth album.

Description
When Jackson was asked to compose a song for the film, he composed several pieces that were released as an album in September 1983. The film was eventually scored by John Barry, with little of Jackson's music retained. The album reached the Top 100 in the United States, and the songs  "Memphis" and "Cosmopolitan" were released as singles. "Breakdown", another song from the album, was nominated for a Grammy in the Best Pop Instrumental Performance category.

The Mike's Murder soundtrack was first released on CD, in its entirety, as part of the three-disc The Ultimate Collection  in 2003, and separately released on CD in 2006 on the Lilith label. The album's first five tracks were also included on the 2003 deluxe edition reissue of Jackson's Night and Day album.

In June 2009, Prometheus Records released a CD of John Barry's replacement soundtrack, containing the entire score.

Track listing
Written, arranged and produced by Joe Jackson.

Charts

Weekly charts

Year-end charts

Personnel 
 Musicians
 Joe Jackson – keyboards, vibraphone, xylophone, percussion, alto saxophone, vocals
 Graham Maby – bass
 Larry Tolfree – drums
 Sue Hadjopoulos – congas,  bongos, percussion
 Joy Askew - Prophet V synthesizer programming
 Production
 Joe Jackson - arrangements, producer
 Brad Leigh - recording engineer
 Larry Franke - assistant recording engineer
 Phil Jamtaas - mixing engineer
 David Bianco - assistant mixing engineer

References

External links 
 Mike's Murder album information at The Joe Jackson Archive

Joe Jackson (musician) soundtracks
1983 soundtrack albums
A&M Records soundtracks
Drama film soundtracks